Peabody Park is a park run by the city of Memphis that offers a playground, aqua play (summer), and the Raymond Skinner Center. The address of the Raymond Skinner Center is listed as 712 Tanglewood, but the park sits just behind the facility and is bordered by the streets Cooper and Higbee.

References
City of Memphis - Neighborhood Parks and Urban Plazas (Under 25 Acres)

External links
Raymond Skinner Center 

Parks in Memphis, Tennessee